Charles P. Robinson (November 9, 1945 – July 11, 2021) was an American stage, film and television actor. He is best known for his role on the NBC sitcom Night Court as Macintosh "Mac" Robinson (Seasons 2–9), the clerk of the court and a Vietnam War veteran. Although his most frequent on-screen billing was Charlie Robinson, Night Court had credited him as Charles Robinson throughout his 1984–1992 stint as Mac. In two of his earliest film appearances, 1974's Sugar Hill and 1975's The Black Gestapo, he was credited as Charles P. Robinson. Some of his credits have been occasionally commingled with ones of older actor Charles Knox Robinson who, billed as Charles Robinson, was featured in numerous films and TV episodes between 1958 and 1971.

Early career
In Robinson's early career, he was a singer: as a teenager with the group Archie Bell and the Drells and later with a group called Southern Clouds of Joy.

Later career
Robinson's acting credits include appearances in Black Gestapo, Emergency!, The White Shadow, Flamingo Road, The Fresh Prince of Bel Air, The Game, Touched by an Angel, and Antwone Fisher.  Robinson was cast in the role of Newdell in the NBC comedy Buffalo Bill.  Not the success it was expected to be, Buffalo Bill was canceled after two seasons and replaced by Night Court. Robinson was cast as court clerk Mac Robinson, after the first season in 1984, when Karen Austin, who played the original court clerk, left the cast.  Robinson played the role on Night Court from 1984 until the show ended in 1992. He also directed three episodes of the series. Also worked on Home Improvement

From 1992 to 1995, Robinson co-starred on the sitcom Love & War, replacing John Hancock who died a few episodes into the series run.  Robinson played character Bud Harper in Home Improvement, and appeared in many other television shows including House, The Bernie Mac Show, My Wife and Kids, Soul Food, Charmed, Hart of Dixie, How I Met Your Mother, and My Name Is Earl.

He did commercial work for NEXTEL in which he asks a worker if he's "agitating my dots" after he walks in on two other dispatchers staring at the dots, which represented delivery workers, on a computer screen. He also did commercials for Old Spice, where he played the head coach of the NFL's Denver Broncos,  appearing with perennial All-Pro Bronco linebacker Von Miller.

In 2010, Robinson worked at the Oregon Shakespeare Festival and co-starred in the film Jackson which was directed by J.F. Lawton. Robinson appeared as "Troy" in August Wilson's Fences at Southern California's South Coast Repertory in Costa Mesa from January 22, 2010 until February 21, 2010. In September 2013, he returned to the theater to portray Willy Loman in Death of a Salesman. In 2015, he played Mr. Munson, the blind tenant on Mom whom Bonnie avoids helping out with apartment issues.

Illness and death

Robinson died on July 11, 2021, at Ronald Reagan UCLA Medical Center, from cardiac arrest with multisystem organ failure due to septic shock and metastatic adenocarcinoma, a type of glandular cancer. He was 75.

Awards and nominations
Robinson received the NAACP Image Award for Outstanding Actor in a Comedy Series.

Filmography

Film

Television

References

External links

1945 births
2021 deaths
Male actors from Houston
African-American male actors
American male film actors
American male stage actors
American male television actors
20th-century American male actors
21st-century American male actors
Deaths from adenoid cystic carcinoma
Deaths from cancer in California
20th-century African-American people
21st-century African-American people